Onfroy is a surname of French origin and a variant of Humphrey. Notable people with the surname include:
Jahseh Onfroy (1998–2018), American rapper known professionally as XXXTentacion
Théophile Onfroy (born 1992), French rower
Valentin Onfroy (born 1993), French rower

References